The Spicket River is a  river located in New Hampshire and Massachusetts in the United States. It is a left tributary of the Merrimack River, part of the Gulf of Maine watershed. It is sometimes spelled "Spickett".

The Spicket River begins at the outlet of Island Pond in Derry, New Hampshire, and flows south into Salem, New Hampshire, passing through the Arlington Mill Reservoir.

See also

List of rivers of Massachusetts
List of rivers of New Hampshire

References

Lawrence, Massachusetts
Tributaries of the Merrimack River
Methuen, Massachusetts
Rivers of Essex County, Massachusetts
Rivers of New Hampshire
Rivers of Massachusetts
Rivers of Rockingham County, New Hampshire